Tony Hervey (born December 19, 1985) is an American mixed martial artist who last competed in the Lightweight division. A professional competitor from 2006 until 2015, he competed for Bellator, Shooto, and King of the Cage, where he was the Welterweight Champion and Lightweight Champion.

Championships and accomplishments
King of the Cage
KOTC Welterweight Championship (One time)
KOTC Lightweight Championship (One time)

Mixed martial arts record

| Loss
| align=center| 17-20
| Khaos Williams
| Decision (unanimous)
| TWC: Brooks vs. Robinson
| 
| align=center| 3
| align=center| 5:00
| Lansing, Michigan, United States
| Catchweight (165 lbs) bout. For TWC Catchweight Championship.
|-
| Loss
| align=center| 17-19
| Jason Fischer
| Decision (unanimous)
| Bellator 124
| 
| align=center| 3
| align=center| 5:00
| Plymouth Township, Michigan, United States
| 
|-
| Loss
| align=center| 17-18
| Jesse Gross
| Decision (unanimous)
| PFS: Pro Fighting Series 3
| 
| align=center| 3
| align=center| 5:00
| Sarnia, Ontario, Canada
| 
|-
| Loss
| align=center| 17-17
| Colin Fletcher
| Decision (split)
| BAMMA 15: Thompson vs. Selmani
| 
| align=center| 3
| align=center| 5:00
| London, England, United Kingdom
| 
|-
| Win
| align=center| 17-16
| Curtis Demarce
| Decision (split)
| KOTC: Out Cold
| 
| align=center| 3
| align=center| 5:00
| Cold Lake, Alberta, Canada
|Catchweight (160 lbs) bout.
|-
| Loss
| align=center| 16-16
| Jake Murphy
| Decision (Unanimous)
| GWC: The British Invasion: U.S. vs. U.K.
| 
| align=center| 3
| align=center| 5:00
| Kansas City, Missouri, United States
| 
|-
| Loss
| align=center| 16-15
| Frank Caraballo
| Submission (Guillotine Choke)
| NAAFS: Caged Vengeance 13
| 
| align=center| 1
| align=center| 2:42
| Canton, Ohio, United States
|Catchweight (150 lbs) bout.
|-
| Loss
| align=center| 16-14
| Alexander Sarnavskiy
| Decision (Unanimous)
| Bellator LXXXIII
| 
| align=center| 3
| align=center| 5:00
| Atlantic City, New Jersey, United States
| 
|-
| Win
| align=center| 16-13
| Jorge Britto
| TKO (Doctor Stoppage)
| SFS 6: Score Fighting Series 6
| 
| align=center| 2
| align=center| 5:00
| Sarnia, Ontario, Canada
| 
|-
| Win
| align=center| 15-13
| Buddy Clinton
| Submission (triangle choke)
| KOTC: Aerial Assault 1
| 
| align=center| 4
| align=center| 1:50
| Thackerville, Oklahoma, United States
|Welterweight debut; won vacant KOTC Welterweight Championship.
|-
| Loss
| align=center| 14-13
| Mike Ricci
| Decision (unanimous)
| Ringside MMA 13: The Saint Patrick's Day Beatdown
| 
| align=center| 3
| align=center| 5:00
| Montreal, Quebec, Canada
| 
|-
| Loss
| align=center| 14-12
| Jesse Ronson
| Submission (rear-naked choke)
| SFS 3: Meltdown in the Valley
| 
| align=center| 2
| align=center| 4:25
| Sarnia, Ontario, Canada
| 
|-
| Win
| align=center| 14-11
| Brad Cardinal
| TKO (punches)
| Freedom Fight: For Honor and Pride
| 
| align=center| 3
| align=center| 3:45
| Sudbury, Ontario, Canada
| 
|-
| Win
| align=center| 13-11
| Mike Campbell
| KO (punch)
| CES MMA: Cage of Pain
| 
| align=center| 1
| align=center| 3:31
| Lincoln, Rhode Island, United States
| 
|-
| Loss
| align=center| 12-11
| Taiki Tsuchiya
| TKO (punches)
| Shooto: Shootor's Legacy 1
| 
| align=center| 1
| align=center| 4:25
| Tokyo, Japan
| 
|-
| Loss
| align=center| 12-10
| Shane Campbell
| Decision (split)
| Awada Combat Club: ERA Fight Night
| 
| align=center| 3
| align=center| 5:00
| Edmonton, Alberta, Canada
| 
|-
| Loss
| align=center| 12-9
| Jarrod Card
| Submission 
| Xtreme Fighting Championships
| 
| align=center| N/A
| align=center| /A
| Florida, United States
|
|-
| Loss
| align=center| 12-8
| Yukinari Tamura
| Submission (rear-naked choke)
| KOTC: Sniper
| 
| align=center| 1
| align=center| 2:25
| San Bernardino, California, United States
| 
|-
| Win
| align=center| 12-7
| Scott Bickerstaff
| KO (punches)
| KOTC: Underground 56
| 
| align=center| 1
| align=center| 0:17
| Sault Ste. Marie, Michigan, United States
| 
|-
| Loss
| align=center| 11-7
| Kotetsu Boku
| Decision (unanimous)
| KOTC: Toryumon
| 
| align=center| 3
| align=center| 5:00
| Okinawa, Japan, United States
| 
|-
| Loss
| align=center| 11-6
| David Shepherd
| Submission (rear-naked choke)
| KOTC: Title Defense
| 
| align=center| 1
| align=center| 4:19
| Sault Ste. Marie, Michigan, United States
| Lost KOTC Lightweight Championship.
|-
| Loss
| align=center| 11-5
| Takanori Gomi
| Decision (unanimous)
| VTJ 2009: Vale Tudo Japan 2009
| 
| align=center| 5
| align=center| 5:00
| Tokyo, Japan
| 
|-
| Win
| align=center| 11-4
| Victor Valenzuela
| TKO (doctor stoppage)
| KOTC: Superstars
| 
| align=center| 2
| align=center| 1:32
| Highland, California, United States
| Won KOTC Lightweight Championship.
|-
| Win
| align=center| 10-4
| Alberto Crane
| KO (punches)
| KOTC: Militia
| 
| align=center| 1
| align=center| 0:12
| San Bernardino, California, United States
| 
|-
| Win
| align=center| 9-4
| Mike Roberts
| TKO (punches)
| KOTC: Fusion
| 
| align=center| 2
| align=center| 1:19
| Mount Pleasant, Michigan, United States
| 
|-
| Loss
| align=center| 8-4
| Angelo Sanchez
| Decision (split)
| KOTC: Goodfellas
| 
| align=center| 5
| align=center| 5:00
| Albuquerque, New Mexico, United States
| 
|-
| Win
| align=center| 8-3
| Gabe Rivas
| TKO (doctor stoppage)
| KOTC: Misconduct
| 
| align=center| 1
| align=center| 0:00
| Highland, California, United States
| 
|-
| Win
| align=center| 7-3
| Josh Cate
| TKO (punches)
| XFC 5: Return of the Giant
| 
| align=center| 1
| align=center| 0:27
| Tampa, Florida, United States
| 
|-
| Loss
| align=center| 6-3
| Frank Santore
| Decision (unanimous)
| XFC 3: Rage in the Cage
| 
| align=center| 3
| align=center| 5:00
| Tampa, Florida, United States
| 
|-
| Loss
| align=center| 6-2
| Pat Curran
| Submission (rear-naked choke)
| XFO 22: Rising Star
| 
| align=center| 1
| align=center| 1:24
| Lakemoor, Illinois, United States
| 
|-
| Win
| align=center| 6-1
| Derek Griffin
| KO (punch)
| Combat: USA
| 
| align=center| 1
| align=center| 0:40
| Green Bay, Wisconsin, United States
| 
|-
| Win
| align=center| 5-1
| Ryan Stock
| Submission (guillotine choke)
| EFC 6: Evolution FC 6
| 
| align=center| 1
| align=center| N/A
| West Bend, Wisconsin, United States
| 
|-
| Win
| align=center| 4-1
| Nick Pugh
| TKO (punches)
| TFC: Toledo Fight Challenge
| 
| align=center| 1
| align=center| 4:04
| Toledo, Ohio, United States
| 
|-
| Win
| align=center| 3-1
| Bryan Goldsby
| Submission (choke)
| XFF 6: Xtreme Freestyle Fighting 6
| 
| align=center| 1
| align=center| 3:08
| Dalton, Georgia, United States
| 
|-
| Loss
| align=center| 2-1
| Billy Vaughan
| Submission (heel hook)
| FF: Capitol Punishment
| 
| align=center| 1
| align=center| 0:59
| Columbus, Ohio, United States
| 
|-
| Win
| align=center| 2-0
| Richard Bear
| Submission (armlock)
| FF: 14
| 
| align=center| N/A
| align=center| N/A
| Columbus, Ohio, United States
|
|-
| Win
| align=center| 1-0
| Diego Paisedes
| Submission (rear-naked choke)
| IMMT: Iowa Meanest Man Tournament
| 
| align=center| 1
| align=center| 0:32
| Iowa, United States
|

Mixed martial arts amateur record

|-
| Loss
| align=center| 3-2
| Grant Hoppel
| Submission (rear-naked choke)
| NLF 9: Next Level Fighting 9
| 
| align=center| 2
| align=center| 2:52
| Steubenville, Ohio, United States
| 
|-
| Win
| align=center| 3-1
| John Myers
| Submission (choke)
| FightFest: Black and Blues Tour
| 
| align=center| 2
| align=center| 1:53
| Cleveland, Ohio, United States
| 
|-
| Win
| align=center| 2-1
| Richard Bear
| Submission (armbar)
| FF 12: Fightfest 12
| 
| align=center| 1
| align=center| 2:50
| Canton, Ohio, United States
| 
|-
| Loss
| align=center| 1-1
| Cal Ferry
| Decision (unanimous)
| XFO: Xtreme Fighting Organization 15
| 
| align=center| 3
| align=center| 3:00
| Lakemoor, Illinois, United States
| 
|-
| Win
| align=center| 1-0
| Steven Grguric
| TKO (referee stoppage)
| ICE 23: International Combat Events
| 
| align=center| 2
| align=center| 1:08
| 
|

See also
List of male mixed martial artists

References

External links
 

1985 births
American male mixed martial artists
Featherweight mixed martial artists
Lightweight mixed martial artists
Living people